Comitas hayashii is a species of sea snails, a marine gastropod mollusc in the family Pseudomelatomidae, the turrids and allies

Distribution
This marine species occurs off Japan.

References

 Shikama T. (1977). Descriptions of new and noteworthy Gastropoda from western Pacific and Indian Oceans. Science Reports of the Yokohama National University, section II (Geology). 24: 1-23, 5 pls. page(s): 19

External links
 
 Biolib.cz: Comitas hayashii

hayashii
Gastropods described in 1977